"Breathe Gentle" is a duet by Italian singer Tiziano Ferro and American singer Kelly Rowland.

It was written and composed by Ferro, Ivano Fossati and Billy Mann for Ferro's fourth studio album, Alla mia età (2008), and released as the album's third single in February 2009 (see 2009 in music) throughout Europe.

The song reached  #1 on the Italian Airplay Charts and #9 on the Dutch Top 40.

In Italy "Indietro" was released, the Italian version of "Breathe Gentle".

Music video
The music video for the song was shot at Lake Garda, directed by Gaetano Morbioli and its content is similar to that of James Bond movies.
In the video, Ferro and Rowland are two thieves living a dangerous love story. In the end, they are close to getting caught by the police after a heist apparently staged to steal a valuable diamond, but they manage to fly away together successfully in a helicopter.

Formats and track listings
Digital single
 "Breathe Gentle" (album version) – 3:41
 "Indietro" (Live @ Rolling Stone) – 3:45

EP album
 "Breathe Gentle" (album version) – 3:41
 "Alla mia età" (acoustic remix) – 3:28
 "Breathe Gentle" (Tiziano's audio comment) – 1:42

Charts
Weekly charts

Year-end charts

Certifications

References

External links
 TizianoFerro.com — official site
 KellyRowlandOnline.com — official site

2009 singles
Tiziano Ferro songs
Kelly Rowland songs
Songs written by Billy Mann
Songs written by Tiziano Ferro
Macaronic songs
Pop ballads
Contemporary R&B ballads
2008 songs
EMI Records singles
Songs written by Ivano Fossati
Song recordings produced by Michele Canova